Mix 103.7 may refer to:

CFVR-FM, a radio station in Fort McMurray, Alberta
KKBJ-FM, a radio station in Bemidji, Minnesota